Fantasy Games Unlimited (FGU) is a publishing house for tabletop and role-playing games. The company has no in-house design teams and relies on submitted material from outside talent.

History
Founded in the summer of 1975  in Jericho, New York by Scott Bizar, the company's first publications were the wargames Gladiators and Royal Armies of the Hyborean Age. Upon the appearance and popularity of Dungeons & Dragons from TSR, the company turned its attentions to role-playing games, seeking and producing systems from amateurs and freelancers, paying them 10% of the gross receipts. FGU also copyrighted their games in the name of the designer so that the designer would receive any additional royalties for licensed figurines and other uses. Rather than focusing on one line and supporting it with supplements, FGU produced a stream of new games. Because of the disparate authors, the rules systems were incompatible. FGU Incorporated published dozens of role-playing games.

Fantasy Games Unlimited won the All Time Best Ancient Medieval Rules for 1979 H.G. Wells Award at Origins 1980 for Chivalry & Sorcery.

In 1991, Fantasy Games Unlimited Inc. was dissolved as a New York corporation. Bizar continues to publish in Arizona as a sole proprietorship called Fantasy Games Unlimited.

A new FGU website appeared in July 2006 offering the company's back catalog. It said that new products would be "coming soon". New Aftermath! products appeared in 2008. By 2010, much of the company's back catalog was available. At that time, FGU sought submissions for new adventures for their existing titles, primarily Aftermath!, Space Opera, and Villains and Vigilantes.

Publications

 Aftermath!
 Archworld (1977)
 Bireme & Galley (1978) 
 Blue Light Manual
 Broadsword
 Bunnies & Burrows
 Bushido
 Castle Plans
 Chivalry & Sorcery (1st & 2nd editions)
 Citadel
 Daredevils
 Diadem
 Down Styphon!
 Fire, Hack & Run
 Flash Gordon & the Warriors of Mongo
 Flashing Blades
 Frederick the Great
 Freedom Fighters
 Galactic Conquest
 Gangster!
 Gladiators
 Land of the Rising Sun
 Lands of Adventure
 Legion
 Lords & Wizards
 Madame Guillotine
 Merc
 Mercenary
 Middle Sea
 Odysseus
 Oregon Trail
 Other Suns
 Pieces of Eight
 Privateers & Gentlemen
 Psi World
 Royal Armies of the Hyborean Age
 Skull and Crossbones: Roleplay on the Spanish Main
 Space Marines
 Space Opera
 Star Explorer
 Starship: The Game of Space Contact
 Starships & Spacemen (now owned by Goblinoid Games)
 Swordbearer
 The Blue-Light Manual
 Towers for Tyrants
 Tyrannosaurus wrecks
 Villains and Vigilantes
 War of the Ring
 War of the Sky Cities
 Wargaming magazine
 Wild West
 Year of the Phoenix

References

External links
 
 Mirror of the old official FGU site
 Interview with Scott Bizar

Publishing companies established in 1975
Role-playing game publishing companies
Companies based in Arizona
1975 establishments in New York (state)